Counter rocket, artillery, and mortar, abbreviated C-RAM or counter-RAM, is a set of systems used to detect and/or destroy incoming rockets, artillery, and mortar rounds in the air before they hit their ground targets, or simply provide early warning.

Types

United States: Land-Based Phalanx Weapon System 

The 20mm Land-Based Phalanx Weapon System (also called C-RAM) is a land-based variant of the U.S. Navy's Phalanx close-in weapon system, a radar-controlled rapid-fire gun for close-in protection of vessels from missiles. Both use a forward-looking infrared (FLIR) camera to allow their operators to visually identify incoming fire before opening fire. But while naval Phalanx systems fire tungsten armor-piercing rounds, the C-RAM uses the 20mm HEIT-SD (high-explosive incendiary tracer, self-destruct) ammunition, originally developed for the M163 Vulcan air defense system. These rounds explode on impact with the target, or on tracer burnout, thereby greatly reducing the risk of collateral damage from rounds that fail to hit their target.

Israel: Iron Dome 
Iron Dome is an Israeli missile system featuring multiple-target tracking and self-guided missile interceptors. Due to the ongoing increase of its engagement range and new missile and interception improvements, plus surface-to-air missile capability, it has developed into a fully-fledged air defence system. By November 2012, the system had intercepted over 400 rockets fired into Israel by Gaza Strip militants. Based on operational success, defense reporter Mark Thompson estimates that Iron Dome is currently the most-effective and most-tested counter missile system in existence.

Germany: Nächstbereichschutzsystem MANTIS 
Nächstbereichschutzsystem MANTIS is a 35mm fully automated C-RAM system, produced by Rheinmetall based on Oerlikon's Skyshield. It has been in use by the  Luftwaffe from 2011.

Italy: Porcupine 
A typical Porcupine configuration for the Italian Army consists of four firing units, one central control post for target designation and weapon control and a 3D radar system "track while scan type" for surveillance and target tracking. Each remote firing unit consists of a 20 mm M61A1 Gatling cannon, its ammunition handling system and a stabilised optronic infra-red (IR) tracking system.

Italy: DRACO 
The DRACO is a multipurpose weapon station operating against Air, R.A.M. and Surface targets. It was designed for the Italian Army by OTO-Melara using the Centauro 8x8 wheeled armored vehicle chassis. The main armament consists of a high rate of fire 76mm/62 gun with an automatic ammunition loading system; the 76mm/62 gun is electrically controlled for elevation and traversing, and is stabilized in elevation. DRACO can be installed on 8x8 wheeled platforms, for combat support operations or convoy defence, as well as on tracked vehicles or on shelters for point defence. The main 76mm/62 gun and the automatic loading system are fully compatible with all in service 76mm rounds and also with 76mm DART guided ammunition. DRACO can be completely controlled by two Operators (the Commander and the Gunner) from a remote position, located inside the hull for mobile installation or inside a protected command shelter for fixed installation.

China: LD-2000 
The LD-2000 SPAAGM is a Chinese developed land-based close-in weapon system. LD-2000 is based on the Chinese Navy's Type 730 CIWS. In operation, it pairs with a Counter Battery Radar.

Netherlands: Goalkeeper 
Goalkeeper CIWS is a Dutch close-in weapon system (CIWS) introduced in 1979. It is an autonomous and completely automatic weapon system for short-range defence of ships against highly manoeuvrable missiles, aircraft and fast-manoeuvering surface vessels. Once activated the system automatically undertakes the entire air defence process from surveillance and detection to destruction, including the selection of the next priority target.

Russia: AK-630 
The AK-630 is a Soviet and Russian fully automatic naval close-in weapon system based on a six-barreled 30 mm rotary cannon. It is mounted in an enclosed automatic turret and directed by MR-123 radar and television detection and tracking. The system's primary purpose is defense against anti-ship missiles and other precision guided weapons. However it can also be employed against fixed or rotary wing aircraft, ships and other small craft, coastal targets, and floating mines.

Directed energy research

The United States has been enhancing its directed-energy weapon capabilities aimed at countering threats posed by missiles. A directed-energy weapon is a ranged weapon system that inflicts damage at a target by the emission of highly focused energy, including laser, microwaves and particle beams. The US Army awarded a $29m contract in 2016 to Kratos Defense & Security Solutions for prototyping of such systems.

The U.S. defense contractor Raytheon is developing a laser-based variation where low cost focused lasers will provide increased range and decreased time-to-intercept over the gun. A proof of concept was demonstrated on a 60 mm mortar round in 2006.

Iron Beam is an air defense system in development by Israeli defense contractor Rafael Advanced Defense Systems. In addition, the system could also intercept unmanned aerial vehicles. Iron Beam will constitute the fifth element of Israel's integrated air defense system, in addition to Arrow 2, Arrow 3, David's Sling, and Iron Dome. However, Iron Beam is also a stand-alone system.

Operating units (by country)  
 : Australian Army
16th Air Land Regiment
 : German Air Force
 Air Defence Group 61 of Flugabwehrraketengeschwader 1, operating the MANTIS.
 : Italian Army
Currently deploying Porcupine batteries and DRACO multipurpose weapon station
 : Israel Defense Forces
 The Israeli Air Defense Command is currently deploying 10 Iron dome batteries.
 : People's Liberation Army
 PLA operates LD-2000 C-RAM for stationary air defense.
 : British Army
16 Regiment Royal Artillery
 : United States Army
 5th Battalion, 5th Air Defense Artillery Regiment (5-5th ADAR), Fort Sill, OK
 HHB/5-5th ADAR
 A/5-5th ADAR 
 B/5-5th ADAR 
 2nd Battalion, 44th Air Defense Artillery Regiment (2-44th ADAR), Fort Campbell, KY
 A/2-44th ADAR 
 B/2-44th ADAR 
 C/2-44th ADAR 
 TF 1-174th (CRAM), 174th Air Defense Artillery Regiment, Ohio National Guard
 HHB/1-174th
 A/1-174th
 B/1-174th
 C/1-174th
 D/1-174th
 B/205th Field Artillery (Radar)
 US Navy detachment, Phalanx operators

See also
 Counter-battery radar

References

Anti-aircraft guns of the United States
Anti-aircraft warfare
Close-in weapon systems
Land active protection systems
Military robots
Missile defense
Multinational force involved in the Iraq War
Raytheon Company products